The Star was a sailing event on the Sailing at the 1952 Summer Olympics program in Harmaja. Seven races were scheduled. 42 sailors, on 21 boats, from 21 nations competed.

Results 

DNF = Did Not Finish, DNS= Did Not Start, DSQ = Disqualified 
 = Male,  = Female

Daily standings

Conditions at Harmaja 
Of the total of three race area's only two were needed during the Olympics in Harmaja. Each of the classes was using the same scoring system.

Notes

References 
 

 

Star
Star (keelboat) competitions